Bas-e Malakhi (also Romanized as Bas-e Malakhī; also known as Bast-e Malakhī) is a village in Jam Rural District, in the Central District of Jam County, Bushehr Province, Iran. At the 2006 census, its population was 751, in 133 families.

References 

Populated places in Jam County